Aviana Airways may refer to:

 Royal Bengal Airlines, the trading name for Aviana Airways Ltd (Bangladesh)
 Inter Island Airways, a subsidiary of Nevada-based Aviana Airways